Yoho Ahoy is a 2000–01 British animated children's television series about a group of pirates, known as Yohos, who live on board their big pirate ship, The Rubber Duck. The title of the show derives from the fact that the only words the main characters say, depending on their feelings are "Yoho" and "Ahoy", that is a language. The characters themselves are animated puppets. In Spring 2001, the show itself won the Banff Television Festival Rockie Award: Best Animation for "Yoho Ahoy: Buzz with Jones". The show was first broadcast on CBBC and later on CBeebies in the United Kingdom, while in Canada, the programme aired on Knowledge Network.

Characters

Main
Bilge - The ship's dark blue captain who wants the ship being clean and tidy at all times.
Cutlass - The ship's yellow anchor hoister who is Grog's best friend.
Swab - The ship's purple first mate who wears a white circle-shaped ring on every ear. 
Poop - The ship's yellow sleepy cabin cleaner who always wears a blue yellow-spotted hat. 
Jones - The ship's green engineer who takes his job very seriously. 
Grog - The ship's green chef who wears a green yellow-spotted hat and like some of the other Yohos, sleeps in a hammock.
Plank - The ship's yellow deck scrubber who looks identical to Cutlass. 
Plunder - The ship's purple anchor hauler who looks identical to Swab, the Rubber Duck's first mate. 
Booty - Flamingo's owner who serves as the ship's beige pianist.

Others
Flamingo - The only flamingo on board the ship who is Booty's pet. He still enjoys causing mischief on board The Rubber Duck, often by taking things from the Yohos without them noticing. Flamingo's one way of communicating is by squawking.
Parrot - Bilge's green parrot with a purple beak who can fly around the Rubber Duck unaided. Just like Bilge and the other Yohos, Parrot says the two following words: "Yoho" and "Ahoy".
The Rats - The only pink and blue rats on board the pirate ship who appear in most surprising places. With their squeaky communication, the rats, who are often followed around by Cat, cause nothing but trouble wherever they go.
The Moon - A blue voiceless moon which appears at the beginning and end of some episodes, including Lullaby With Booty and Feast With Rats. At night, the moon can be seen shining in the dark sky next to The Rubber Duck, along with some purple clouds and shiny stars.
Cat - The only male ginger cat on board the ship who often chases the pink and blue rats around whenever he sees them. Just like all real cats, Cat's way of communicating is by mewing.
Crow - The only crow on board the ship who is often seen on screen looking out for the Yohos, although he doesn't look like a real crow at all.

Voice Cast
 Mole Hill as Bilge and Crow
 Simi Mougne as Cutlass
 Sarah Thornhill as Booty 
 Shelly Wain as Swab and Plunder
 Julian Roberts as Poop, Parrot and Cat
 Joss Cope as Grog, Plank and the Rats 
 Mark Slater as Jones and Flamingo 
 Tim Woodward as The Narrator (audiobooks only)

Episodes

Series 1 (2000)

Series 2 (2001)

UK VHS tape releases

2000 Video Game
In 2000, BBC Multimedia developed a video game based on the series. The game consists of a collection of 7 mini-games.

References

External links

2000 British television series debuts
2001 British television series endings
2000s British animated television series
2000s British children's television series
2000s preschool education television series
Animated preschool education television series
British preschool education television series
British children's animated adventure television series
BBC children's television shows
British stop-motion animated television series
British television shows featuring puppetry
English-language television shows
Television series by BBC Studios
Australian Broadcasting Corporation original programming
CBeebies